1990 Football Championship of Ukrainian SSR was the 60th season of association football competition of the Ukrainian SSR, which at the time was a part of the Soviet Lower Second League. The Soviet Second League was split this season and all national (republican) competitions were placed at the lower league (4th division), while the upper league (3rd division) was transformed into a buffer league. The 1990 Football Championship of Ukrainian SSR was won for the first time by FC Torpedo Zaporizhia.

Teams

Map

Promoted teams
SKA Kyiv – Champion of the Fitness clubs competitions (KFK) (returning to professional level after an absence of 2 seasons)

Relegated teams 
 None

Realigned teams
 FC Desna Chernihiv – Placed 17th in the Zone 5 of Second League, (returning to republican competitions after a year of absence)

League standings

Top goalscorers

The following were the top ten goalscorers.

See also
 Soviet Second League B

External links
 1990 Soviet Lower Second League, Zone 1 (Ukrainian SSR football championship). Luhansk football portal

1990
4
4
Football Championship of the Ukrainian SSR